Club Deportivo Graneros Unido is a Chilean Football club, their home town is Graneros, Chile.

The club were founded on May 7, 1917 and participated for 4 years in Tercera División A and 10 seasons in Tercera División B.

Seasons played
4 seasons in Tercera División A
10 seasons in Tercera División B

Titles
Tercera División B: 1 (1991)

See also
Chilean football league system

Graneros Unido
Graneros Unido
1917 establishments in Chile